Hlompho Kalake (born 2 September 1994) is a Mosotho footballer who plays as a midfielder for Lesotho Premier League club Bantu FC and the Lesotho national team.

References

External links

1994 births
Living people
Lesotho footballers
Association football midfielders
Bantu FC players
Lesotho international footballers